The 2004 Speedway World Cup Qualification (SWC) was a two events of motorcycle speedway meetings used to determine the two national teams who qualify for the 2004 Speedway World Cup. According to the FIM rules the top six nations (Sweden, Australia, Denmark, Poland, Great Britain and Czech Republic) from the 2003 Speedway World Cup were automatically qualified.

Results

Heat details

Lonigo (1) 
Qualifying round 1
 10 July 2004
  Lonigo, Santa Marina Stadium
 Referee: ?

Gyula (2) 
Qualifying round 2
 10 July 2004
  Gyula
 Referee: ?

References

See also 
 2004 Speedway World Cup

Q